A nettop (or miniature PC, Mini PC or Smart Micro PC) is a small-sized, inexpensive, low-power, legacy-free desktop computer designed for basic tasks such as web browsing, accessing web-based applications, document processing, and audio/video playback. The word nettop is a portmanteau of network and desktop. It is the desktop counterpart of the netbook. Modern ( 2020) mini PCs or small form factor PCs can be much more powerful, being equipped with high-end laptop components or mid-range desktop components. 

Compared with ordinary desktop computers, nettops are not only smaller and less expensive, but they also consume much less power. For example, CompuLab's fit-PC2 consumes no more than 8 watts of power whereas a typical desktop would easily consume more than 100 watts of power; consequently, nettops require significantly less cooling and may even be completely fanless. Some do not have an optical disk drive and use a solid state drive, making them completely silent. The tradeoff is that the hardware specifications and processing power are usually reduced and hence make nettops less appropriate for running complex or resource-intensive applications.

History

Nettops and mini PCs have what could be considered an unusual history. The "first wave" of such devices, which occurred in the mid to late 2000s, were commonly referred to as "nettops". These included devices such as the Acer AspireRevo seen above, and were commonly considered to be a kind of "temporary substitute" PC of a lower cost for users needing a second PC or for use in developing countries. Another commonly held view at the time was their use as a stepping stone towards a thin-client–based always online computer that would "replace inefficient PCs".

Development of netbooks and the cannibalisation of laptop sales

As demand for these devices quickly waned, the industry responded by addressing the chief complaint that these devices would be better as portable devices such as a new form of laptop. The result was the netbook, a device which was considered the true future of the nettop. However, prevailing attitudes and economic issues in 2008 onward made these popular due to their low cost and portability along with the then-expanding feature-set. In August 2009, reports from reviewers were that a netbook of the time and a traditional laptop of the same price were otherwise identical. The implications that the price of standard notebooks should be dropped was a financial liability, due to huge unsold inventories of standard laptops in retail chains and an unfavorable market in which to unload them meant that cannibalisation of laptop sales by netbooks would be financially undesirable for the industry. A clearance sale was also not an option under these conditions, especially among multiple retail chains and online shopping sites. These factors, along with a desire to keep netbook sales going to recoup R&D, design and manufacturing costs, were all likely contributing factors of an industry-wide effort to sabotage netbooks through purposefully limited devices that could be sold cheaply while acting as a form of social engineering towards discrediting netbook devices.

The direct lineage between nettops and netbooks meant that the concept of a "net-" prefix was considered a failed idea. Devices such as Chromebooks, tablet PCs, Ultrabooks and other devices responded by branding themselves as a different type of device such as ChromeOS being exclusively a pure web client or the proposal that the ultrabook succeeded by compensating for its lighter weight and otherwise equal-performance parts with a higher price tag.

In 2015, a revival of the concept came about from a likely unrelated source, a technological form of convergent evolution. Via the likely-observed success of the stick PC, the idea of combining a system on a chip with a single-board computer has led to a continuation of the nettop's original product goals. Mini PCs such as the MINIX Z83-4 or the Azulle Access Plus are exclusively referred to as "mini PCs", despite being identical or near-identical on paper to the nettop architecture.

Hardware
There are three platforms that are primarily intended for nettops and netbooks:
 Intel's Centrino Atom platform
 Nvidia's Ion platform
 VIA's Trinity Platform

Some nettops have also adopted system-on-a-chip designs. Although many major parts such as chipsets, video cards and storage devices can also be found on desktops, the CPUs that are put inside nettops are the fundamental component that differentiate them from normal desktops. The list below contains a range of hardware components that a typical nettop may be assembled from.

 CPU
 Intel Atom, Core i3 (x86)
 VIA Nano and VIA C7 processors (x86)
 AMD APU (x86)
 AMD Geode (x86)
 ARM Cortex-based CPU (ARM)
 Loongson (MIPS)
 GPU
 Intel GMA 950
 S3 Graphics Chrome
 GeForce 9400M G (integrated into MCP79MX; Nvidia ION platform)
 AMD Radeon HD 6310
 ATI HD4530
 PowerVR
 Chipset
945GSE and 945GC Express chipsets
 MCP79MX (integrated GeForce 9400M G GPU; Nvidia ION platform)
 VIA VX800 IGP Chipset
 RAM
 typically 512 MB to 2 GB SDRAM, DDR or DDR2 memory
 Storage devices
 at least 1 GB flash memory
 2.5" hard disk drive or solid-state drive (SSD)
 Network
 Ethernet and/or Wi-Fi
 I/O ports
 LAN, USB 2.0, video out, audio out

Intel's Atom processor has been adopted by several hardware manufacturers, such as ASUS, MSI, and Sony, for nettops. Nvidia has also released its first generation ION platform, which puts GeForce 9400M Motherboard GPU alongside the Atom processor to provide better high definition video playback ability and lower power consumption. In addition, Nvidia has announced that it will support VIA's CPUs this year. To further reduce the manufacturing cost and improve power efficiency, many manufacturers and start-up companies have chosen to use CPUs that were originally targeted at embedded computing devices such as AMD's Geode and ARM Cortex-based CPUs.

Operating systems
Many net-top models are x86-processor-based and as such are capable of running standard PC OSes. There are also operating systems designed specifically for nettops and other machines in the same performance class. Some high-end nettops are capable of running Windows 10. Google's ChromeOS and Android are other options. Although Google's Android was originally designed for smartphones, it has also taken a seat in the nettop market. Another Linux distribution suitable for nettops is Ubuntu.

Linux is beginning to be the favorite choice of nettop users (considering the high commercial use of these machines), the flexibility and low-requirement capabilities of the OS are perfect for the product.

Market
Nettops fell into Intel's category of "Basic PC", which usually cost from $100 to $299. Intel described nettops as a large potential market at that time. Nettops were said to be able serve as an affordable first computer for people in developing countries, or as an environmentally friendly choice as a secondary computer for people in developed countries.

As a result of successes with Stick PCs and Linux Mint-based Nettop-like computers, as well as continued success of the Mac Mini, the idea was possibly unintentionally revived as Mini PCs, which continue to be sold through online retailers as of August 2017.

See also 
 Netbook
 SFF
 Internet appliance and Thin client
 Plug computer
 Tablet computer
 PC-on-a-stick

 Chromebox and Apple TV 
 AMD APU and Intel Atom
 Cloud computing

References

External links

 
 Approximate computer power usages list by Univ. of Pennsylvania
 Russian portal of nettops

 
Personal computers
Appropriate technology
Cloud clients

de:Netbook#Nettop